Carl Liam Piergianni (born 3 May 1992) is an English professional footballer who plays as a centre-back for  club Stevenage.

A product of Peterborough United's youth academy, Piergianni signed professional terms with the club in May 2010 having already spent time on a work experience loan at Spalding United. He debuted for Peterborough's first team in December 2010, his only senior appearance for the club before his departure at the end of the 2010–11 season. Piergianni joined Conference Premier club Stockport County on a permanent contract in August 2011. 

After a season at Stockport, Piergianni left the club in August 2012 after they were no longer in a position financially to extend his contract. Having spent the 2012–13 season at Corby Town, he signed for divisional rivals Boston United in May 2013. He made 136 appearances during his three years at Boston, where he was named the club's Player of the Year in consecutive seasons, as well as being named in the National League North Team of the Year twice. 

Following a brief spell in Australia playing for South Melbourne, Piergianni returned to England and signed for National League North club Salford City in May 2017. He helped the club earn back-to-back promotions into the English Football League, scoring in the 2019 National League play-off Final. A loan move to League Two club Oldham Athletic followed in January 2020, which was made permanent that August. Piergianni was made club captain during his two years at Oldham. He signed for Stevenage in May 2022, where he was appointed as the club's captain.

Early life
Born in Peterborough, Cambridgeshire, Piergianni attended Stanground College in Peterborough.

Career

Peterborough United
Piergianni was playing in the Peterborough and District Youth League when he was scouted by Peterborough United. He joined Peterborough's youth system in 2007 and was named as the club's under-18 Player of the Year during his time in Peterborough's academy. Whilst still playing for the club's under-18 team, Piergianni joined Spalding United on a work experience loan, where he made six first-team appearances in the Northern Premier League Division One South. Piergianni signed his first professional contract with Peterborough in May 2010, a one-year development agreement.

Piergianni made his Football League debut as a 95th-minute substitute in Peterborough's 2–1 victory against Rochdale on 10 December 2010. He joined Conference Premier club Altrincham on a work experience loan on 31 December 2010. He made his debut for the club the next day, playing the full match in a 0–0 draw with Wrexham. Piergianni made 21 appearances during the 2010–11 season at Altrincham, leaving the club upon the conclusion of his loan at the end of the season. He was released by Peterborough in June 2011.

Stockport County
Piergianni signed for Conference Premier club Stockport County on a free transfer on 10 August 2011.
He scored his first goals in senior football in a 3–3 draw with Hayes & Yeading on 5 November 2011, scoring twice to give Stockport a 3–1 lead in the match. He made 44 appearances in all competitions during the 2011–12 season, his first full season of regular first-team football, scoring four goals, as Stockport finished the season in 16th position in the Conference Premier league standings. 

Stockport offered Piergianni a new contract in May 2012, but the two parties were unable to agree terms. Despite this, Piergianni played in three matches for the club in the opening month of the 2012–13 season. He left Stockport at the end of August 2012, with Director of Football Jim Gannon stating the club were no longer in a position financially to offer Piergianni a new contract.

Corby Town
After leaving Stockport, Piergianni joined Conference North club Corby Town on a non-contract basis on 10 October 2012. He debuted for Corby in the club's 5–2 home defeat to Altrincham on 13 October 2012, scoring a consolation goal for Corby in the second-half of the match. Piergianni was made club captain within a month of his arrival and made 30 appearances during the 2012–13 season, scoring seven goals.

Boston United
Piergianni joined fellow Conference North club Boston United on 17 May 2013, becoming the club's third acquisition ahead of the new season. He made his Boston debut in a 4–1 victory against former employers Stockport County at Edgeley Park on 17 August 2013. Piergianni played 47 times and scored five goals in all competitions during the 2013–14 season. He was voted Boston's Players' Player of the Year at club's end-of-season awards ceremony in a season that saw the club finish in sixth place in the Conference North league table. He was also named in the Conference North Team of the Year that season. Piergianni signed a new two-year contract in May 2014.

Boston made the Conference North play-offs during the 2014–15 season, where they lost to Chorley at the semi-final stage, with Piergianni making 46 appearances in all competitions that season. He was named as the club's Player of the Year in May 2015. Piergianni scored nine goals from central defence during the 2015–16 season as Boston once again qualified for the play-offs after finishing in fifth place. They were defeated in the semi-final by North Ferriby United, losing by a 3–2 aggregate scoreline. At the end of the season, Piergianni was named in the National League North Team of the Year. During his three years at Boston, Piergianni made 136 appearances and scored 19 goals.

South Melbourne
Piergianni opted to leave Boston at the end of the season in order to travel to Australia. He signed for South Melbourne of the National Premier Leagues, Australia's second division, on 12 January 2017. Piergianni debuted for South Melbourne in the 2017 Community Shield, which they lost 2–1 to Bentleigh Greens. He made 13 appearances for the club, 10 of which were in the league, before leaving in the mid-season transfer window in May 2017.

Salford City
Piergianni returned to England and signed a two-year contract with National League North club Salford City on 19 May 2017. He stated that he had aspirations of making a return to the Football League and felt Salford were capable of achieving back-to-back promotions to get there. Piergianni made his Salford debut in the club's first game of the 2017–18 season, a 2–0 home defeat to Darlington. He made 39 appearances and scored three goals as Salford earned promotion to the National League after finishing the season as National League North champions. He was voted as the club's Player of the Year in April 2018 and was also named in the National League North Team of the Year that season.

Piergianni signed a contract extension on 17 December 2018, with the new agreement running until 2021. He played 53 times during the 2018–19 season as Salford earned back-to-back promotions into the Football League after winning the 2019 National League play-off Final, a 3–0 victory against AFC Fylde at Wembley Stadium on 11 May 2019. Piergianni scored Salford's second goal in the match; a header from a corner kick in second-half. The goal was his 11th of the season from central defence. He was named in the National League Team of the Year for the 2018–19 season. Despite playing regularly during the opening two months of the 2019–20 season in League Two, Piergianni was limited to two substitute appearances in two months following back-to-back defeats in September 2019.

Oldham Athletic
Wanting to play first-team football, Piergianni joined fellow League Two club Oldham Athletic on 6 January 2020, on a loan agreement until the end of the 2019–20 season. Oldham manager Dino Maamria highlighted Piergianni's leadership skills and character when the signing was announced. He made 11 appearances during the loan spell before the League Two regular season was curtailed due to the COVID-19 pandemic in March 2020. Piergianni signed for Oldham on a permanent basis on 2 August 2020, agreeing a two-year contract. He scored five times in 45 appearances during the 2020–21 season as Oldham finished in 18th place in League Two. In April 2021, Piergianni won the PFA Community Champion award for the 2020–21 season for his work with the Oldham Athletic Community Trust (OACT) throughout the year.

Piergianni was named club captain during the 2021–22 season. He played 48 times during the season, scoring four goals, as Oldham were relegated to the National League. He won the PFA Community Champion award for the second consecutive season in recognition of his continued work with the OACT. With his Oldham contract set to expire, Piergianni was released by the club at the end of the season.

Stevenage
Piergianni signed for League Two club Stevenage on a free transfer on 23 May 2022. He made his Stevenage debut in the club's 2–1 away victory against Tranmere Rovers on 30 July 2022.

Style of play
Deployed as a centre-back, Piergianni has been described as a "commanding defender". His ability to win aerial duels has been described as one his main strengths, as well as blocking attacking shots and clearing the ball out of defence. An aerial threat from set-pieces, Piergianni has scored the majority of his goals from attacking free kick and corner kicks. Having been appointed as club captain at Corby Town, Oldham and Stevenage, his leadership skills have also been highlighted as a strength.

Career statistics

Honours
Salford City
National League North: 2017–18
National League play-offs: 2019

Individual
Boston United Player of the Year: 2013–14, 2014–15
Salford City Player of the Year: 2018–19
National League North Team of the Year: 2014–15, 2015–16, 2017–18
National League Team of the Year: 2018–19

References

External links

1992 births
Living people
Sportspeople from Peterborough
English people of Italian descent
English footballers
Association football defenders
Peterborough United F.C. players
Spalding United F.C. players
Altrincham F.C. players
Stockport County F.C. players
Boston United F.C. players
Corby Town F.C. players
Salford City F.C. players
South Melbourne FC players
Oldham Athletic A.F.C. players
Stevenage F.C. players
English Football League players
National League (English football) players
National Premier Leagues players
English expatriate footballers
Expatriate soccer players in Australia
English expatriate sportspeople in Australia